Jitendra Maharaj was an Indian dancer and a Kathak maestro. He was a recipient of Sangeet Natak Academy Award given by the government of India. Jitendra Maharaj is from Varanasi Gharana. He has also written on the subject in various publications. Jitendra Maharaj is the guru of Kathak dancers Nalini and Kamalini.

Early life 
Jitendra Maharaj was a disciple of Guru Kishan Kumar Maharaj.

References 

Kathak exponents
Indian male dancers
Year of birth missing (living people)
Living people
Recipients of the Sangeet Natak Akademi Award